RACSA may refer to:

RACSA (airline), Guatemala
Royal Advisory Council for Saharan Affairs